Le cave se rebiffe is a 1961 French comedy film directed by Gilles Grangier, written by Michel Audiard and starring Jean Gabin, Bernard Blier and Martine Carol. The film was retitled The Counterfeiters of Paris for English-speaking countries.

Le cave se rebiffe is the second in the Max le Menteur trilogy, following Touchez pas au grisbi and preceding Les tontons flingueurs. The film trilogy is an adaptation of three novels written by Albert Simonin.

Cast 
 Jean Gabin : Ferdinand Maréchal, aka 'le Dabe'
 Bernard Blier : Charles Lepicard
 Martine Carol : Solange Mideau
 Franck Villard : Éric Masson
 Maurice Biraud : Robert Mideau (aka 'le Cave')
 Antoine Balpêtré : Lucas Malvoisin
 Ginette Leclerc : Léa Lepicard
 Françoise Rosay : Mme Pauline
 Albert Dinan : commissioner Rémy
 Gérard Buhr : detective Martin
 Heinrich Gretler : M. Tauchmann
 Clara Gansard : Georgette
 Robert Dalban : detective Maffeux
 Jacques Marin : detective Larpin
 Charles Bouillaud : engraver
 Marcel Charvey : doctor
 Paul Faivre : Mathias, concierge
 Hélène Dieudonné : wife, concierge
 Gabriel Gobin : horse trainer Vincennes
 René Hell : old garage owner
 Lisa Jouvet : nurse
 Albert Michel : postman
 Antonio Ramirez : horse trainer Caracas
 Pierre Collet : taxi driver
 Max Doria : customs officer
 Claude Ivry : Lucienne

Plot

Éric, a crooked secondhand car dealer in Paris, is having an affair with the flirtatious Solange, whose unemployed husband Robert is a skilled printer and engraver. With two crooked friends, Charles and Lucas, he discusses the idea that they could use the ineffectual Robert to run off some counterfeit banknotes. For this they would need authentic paper and a reliable fence. In fact, they decide, they need to call in an expert and the best man for the job is Ferdinand, living in retirement in Venezuela.

Ferdinand agrees to help but on condition he has half the profits, which sets the other three working on a plot to reduce his take. Aware of their scheming, Ferdinand forms a close rapport with the shy Robert. When Robert has run off the counterfeit notes and delivered them to the fence, he is given an attaché case full of genuine notes which he takes to the airport. On boarding a plane for Venezuela, which has no extradition treaty with France, he finds Ferdinand waiting for him.

Humiliated and out of pocket, the three dupes descend to blows and then start slapping the faithless Solange who started it all.

References

External links 
 

1961 films
Films set in Paris
French comedy films
1960s French-language films
French black-and-white films
Films directed by Gilles Grangier
Films with screenplays by Michel Audiard
Films with screenplays by Albert Simonin
Films scored by Michel Legrand
Counterfeit money in film
1960s French films